Scioto Township is one of the sixteen townships of Ross County, Ohio, United States.  The 2000 census found 27,735 people in the township, 5,940 of whom lived in the unincorporated portions of the township.

Geography
Located in the central part of the county, it borders the following townships:
Springfield Township - northeast
Liberty Township - southeast
Franklin Township - south
Huntington Township - southwest
Twin Township - west
Union Township - northwest

Much of central Scioto Township is occupied by the city of Chillicothe, the county seat of Ross County, while some of the area that remains is occupied by the census-designated place of North Fork Village.

Name and history
It is one of five Scioto Townships statewide.

Government
The township is governed by a three-member board of trustees, who are elected in November of odd-numbered years to a four-year term beginning on the following January 1. Two are elected in the year after the presidential election and one is elected in the year before it. There is also an elected township fiscal officer, who serves a four-year term beginning on April 1 of the year after the election, which is held in November of the year before the presidential election. Vacancies in the fiscal officership or on the board of trustees are filled by the remaining trustees.

Chillicothe Correctional Institution of the Ohio Department of Rehabilitation and Correction is in Scioto Township.

References

External links
County website

Townships in Ross County, Ohio
Townships in Ohio